Cymbaria is a genus of flowering plants in the broomrape family Orobanchaceae, native to Ukraine, Russia,  Kazakhstan, Siberia, the Altai, Mongolia, northern China and Manchuria. They are hemiparasites of other plants, obtaining nutrients through haustoria which attach to the roots of the hosts, and doing some photosynthesis on their own.

Species
Currently accepted species include:

Cymbaria borysthenica Pall. ex Schltdl.
Cymbaria chaneti Gand.
Cymbaria daurica L.
Cymbaria linearifolia K.S.Hao
Cymbaria mongolica Maxim.

References

Orobanchaceae
Orobanchaceae genera